Leslie Walter Claudius (25 March 1927 – 20 December 2012) was an Indian field hockey player from Bilaspur. He studied in South Eastern Railway (Now SECR) English Medium School Bilaspur which has produced many national sportsmen.

Leslie Claudius shares with Udham Singh the distinction of being one of only two Indian players to win four Olympic medals in field hockey. To his gold medals in 1948, 1952 and 1956, he added silver in 1960 when he captained the team. He was the first player ever to earn 100 caps, and competed for India, in addition to the Olympics, on their European tour of 1949, Malaysian tour of 1952, Australian and New Zealand tours of 1955, and at the 3rd Asian Games in 1958. After the 1960 Olympics, he continued to compete domestically, retiring after the 1965 season. In 1971, he became the sixth Indian hockey player to be given the Padma Shri Civil award by the Indian government.

Leslie Claudius had joined Calcutta Customs Department as Preventive Officer and retired as Assistant Collector of Customs. He was a member of Calcutta Customs Club and represented the Calcutta Port Customs Commissionerate in the Aga Khan Tournament in 1948. Leslie Claudius not only brought international glory but also kept the Calcutta Customs Club flag flying high.

Career

Early career
Claudius was initially interested in football and as an accomplished player, he got a chance to play for the Bengal and Nagpur Railway. But, his talent in field hockey was spotted by Dickie Carr, who was a part of the Indian team that won the gold medal at the 1936 Olympics. Claudius was then inducted into the Bengal and Nagpur Railway hockey team that Carr was a part of. The team finished second in the Beighton Cup and Claudius quit football for hockey.

International career
Claudius was a member of India's generation of hockey that won the Olympic gold in 1948, 1952 and 1956 and silver in 1960. He was the first hockey player to have competed in four Olympics and also the first to earn a hundred international caps. He captained the Indian team for the first team in 1959, with  Dhyan Chand, often considered India's greatest hockey player ever as the coach, and led them to the second-place finish at the 1960 Olympics in Rome.

Team Manager
Claudius was appointed as the manager of the Indian team in 1978 for the Bangkok Asian Games.

Personal life
Claudius was of Anglo-Indian descent. His son, Robert, was also an Indian international who represented his country at the World Cup in Argentina in 1978. Leslie died after a prolonged battle with cirrhosis of liver. Leslie had three more sons, one who stayed with him in Kolkata and two who live in Melbourne. His son Robert (Bobby) Claudius played Hockey World Cup in Argentina for India in 1978; he died the same year in Kolkata (then Calcutta) in a road accident.

Awards and recognition

 In 1971 he was awarded the Padma Shri.
 Mention in the Guinness Book of World Records along with Udham Singh for having won the most number of Olympic medals in field hockey.
 In 2011 The West Bengal Chief Minister Mamata Banerjee presented the Bharat Gaurav award instituted by East Bengal Club to Leslie Claudius.
 For the 2012 Olympics, the Bushey tube station was renamed after Claudius in the special "Olympic Legends Map". He was one of six all-time hockey greats who were honored in this manner.
 In 2012 he was awarded The Banga Bibhushan.
 A road in Maidan was named after him as Leslie Claudius Sarani in 2015.

Death
Claudius died in Kolkata on 20 December 2012, after a prolonged battle with cirrhosis of liver. He was survived by his wife and three sons. He is buried in Lower Circular Road cemetery, Kolkata.

See also
List of Indian field hockey captains in Olympics

References

External links
 

1927 births
2012 deaths
Field hockey players from Kolkata
Field hockey players from Chhattisgarh
Olympic field hockey players of India
Field hockey players at the 1948 Summer Olympics
Field hockey players at the 1952 Summer Olympics
Field hockey players at the 1956 Summer Olympics
Field hockey players at the 1960 Summer Olympics
Indian male field hockey players
Olympic gold medalists for India
Indian Christians
Olympic silver medalists for India
Olympic medalists in field hockey
Deaths from cirrhosis
Asian Games medalists in field hockey
Field hockey players at the 1958 Asian Games
People from Bilaspur, Chhattisgarh
Medalists at the 1960 Summer Olympics
Medalists at the 1956 Summer Olympics
Medalists at the 1952 Summer Olympics
Medalists at the 1948 Summer Olympics
Recipients of the Padma Shri in sports
Asian Games silver medalists for India
Medalists at the 1958 Asian Games
Anglo-Indian people